Pulmonary Pharmacology & Therapeutics is a medical journal published by Elsevier that covers research on the pharmacotherapy of lung diseases. It was established in 1988 as Pulmonary Pharmacology and obtained its current title in 1997.

External links 
 

Pharmacology journals
Elsevier academic journals
Pulmonology journals
Bimonthly journals
Publications established in 1997
English-language journals